George Clyde Nowlan,  (14 August 1898 – 31 May 1965) was a Canadian Member of Parliament and Cabinet Minister.  A member of the Progressive Conservative Party of Canada, he served from 9 August 1962–21 April 1963 as the Minister of Finance in the administration of John Diefenbaker, and was also responsible for the CBC.

Early life and education
Nowlan was a soldier in the Canadian Expeditionary Force during the First World War. After the war ended, he returned to the Annapolis Valley of Nova Scotia and attended Acadia University to study for a Bachelor of Arts, graduating in 1920. He then studied law at Dalhousie University.

Political career
Nowlan was an MLA in the Nova Scotia Legislature in the 1920s, and was always known for his reputation as a hard worker and a Party Man. He served a term as the Progressive Conservative Party's president. While serving as Minister of National Revenue in 1962, he forbid Customs to censor or ban entrance to any publication unless a Canadian court had already ruled it to be "obscene", rather than using their own discretion. Five years later, this was overturned.

There is a George Clyde Nowlan fonds at Library and Archives Canada.

Personal life
His son Pat Nowlan later became a Progressive Conservative (and later Independent Progressive Conservative) MP in Nowlan's riding of Kings County.

References 

Margaret Conrad, George Nowlan: Maritime Conservative in National Politics. University of Toronto press, 1986. 

1898 births
1965 deaths
Lawyers in Nova Scotia
Canadian Ministers of Finance
Canadian people of Irish descent
Members of the House of Commons of Canada from Nova Scotia
Members of the King's Privy Council for Canada
People from Digby County, Nova Scotia
Progressive Conservative Party of Canada MPs